Trachichthys australis, the southern roughy, is a species of slimehead and the only member of its genus. It can grow to a maximum length of  SL.

References

External links
 
 
 Southern Roughy @ Fishes of Australia

Trachichthyidae
Marine fish of Australia
Fish described in 1799
Taxa named by George Shaw